Femeniasia balearica is a species of flowering plant in the family Asteraceae, and the only species in the genus Femeniasia.

Distribution and conservation
Femeniasia is endemic to the north-western coast of Menorca, Spain. Its natural habitats are Mediterranean-type shrubby vegetation and sandy shores. It is threatened by habitat loss, and is listed as Critically Endangered on the IUCN Red List.

Taxonomy
Femenasia balearica was first described by Juan Joaquín Rodríguez y Femenías in 1869 as a species of Centaurea. A new genus, Femeniasia, was erected for the species in 1987, and the genus remains monotypic.

References

Cynareae
Monotypic Asteraceae genera
Flora of Spain
Critically endangered plants
Taxonomy articles created by Polbot